Sir Peter Charles Petrie, 5th Baronet, CMG (7 March 1932 – 28 October 2021) was a British diplomat.

Career
Peter Petrie (whose father was the historian Sir Charles Petrie) was educated at Westminster School and Christ Church, Oxford. He served in the Grenadier Guards 1954–56 before entering the Foreign Service. Later, he served in the UK Delegation to NATO in Paris 1958–61 and the UK High Commission in Delhi 1961–64 (also Chargé d'Affaires in Kathmandu in 1963). He was posted to the Cabinet Office 1965–67, the UK Mission to the United Nations in New York 1969–73 and was Head of Chancery at Bonn 1973–76. He returned to the Foreign and Commonwealth Office as head of the European Integration Department 1976–79 before being appointed Minister in the Paris embassy 1979–85 and finally British Ambassador to Belgium 1985–89.

Sir Peter succeeded to the family baronetcy on the death of his half-brother in 1988. After retiring from the Diplomatic Service, he was a member of the Franco-British Council 1994–2002 (chairman of the British section 1997–2002) and a member of the Council of City University London 1997–2002.

Sir Peter was appointed CMG in 1980 and Chevalier of the Legion of Honour in 2006.

He died on 28 October 2021, at the age of 89.

Arms

References
 PETRIE, Sir Peter (Charles), Who's Who 2012, A & C Black, 2012; online edn, Oxford University Press, Dec 2011, accessed 25 March 2012 
 Sir Peter Petrie, Bt, CMG Authorised Biography – Debrett’s People of Today

Baronets in the Baronetage of the United Kingdom
1932 births
2021 deaths
People educated at Westminster School, London
Alumni of Christ Church, Oxford
Ambassadors of the United Kingdom to Belgium
People associated with City, University of London
Companions of the Order of St Michael and St George
Chevaliers of the Légion d'honneur